Kai Abdul Foday (2 March 1924) was a Sierra Leonean politician who served as member of Sierra Leone's parliament representing his hometown of Kono District. He was a member of the Sierra Leone People's Party (SLPP). Kai Abdul Foday was first elected to parliament in the 2002 general elections, he again won re-election in the 2007 general election, although his political party, the SLPP presidential candidate Solomon Berewa lost the presidential election to the APC presidential candidate, Ernest Bai Koroma. Kai Foday comes from the Kissi ethnic group.
Kai Abdul Foday was born on 2 March 1924, in Kamiendor, Mafindor Chiefdom, Kono District.

External links
https://web.archive.org/web/20081010024540/http://parliamentsl.org/members.htm

1924 births
Possibly living people
Members of the Parliament of Sierra Leone
Sierra Leone People's Party politicians
People from Kono District